Porgy & Bess (subtitled Modern Interpretations) is an album by multi-instrumentalist Buddy Collette featuring jazz versions of music from the George Gershwin opera Porgy and Bess recorded at sessions in 1957 and released on the Interlude label in 1959.

Reception

Allmusic awarded the album 2  stars with the review by Scott Yanow stating "other than the unusual colors, little all that surprising happens during the obscure cool jazz effort".

Track listing
All compositions by George Gershwin

 "Oh Bess, Oh Where's My Bess?" - 2:57
 "My Man's Gone Now" - 3:24
 "Summertime" - 4:13
 "It Ain't Necessarily So" - 3:28
 "I Got Plenty o' Nuttin'" - 2:38
 "There's a Boat That's Leavin' for New York" - 3:20
 "Bess, You Is My Woman Now" - 3:26
 "A Woman Is a Sometime Thing" - 4:42

Personnel
Buddy Collette - flute, bass clarinet
Pete Jolly - accordion
Gerald Wiggins - organ
Jim Hall - guitar
Red Callender - bass
Louie Bellson - drums

References

Buddy Collette albums
1959 albums